These are the official results of the Men's 5,000 metres event at the 1995 World Championships in Gothenburg, Sweden. There were a total number of 48 participating athletes, with three qualifying heats and the final held on Sunday 1995-08-13.

Final

Qualifying heats
Held on Friday 1995-08-11

See also
 1993 Men's World Championships 5,000 metres (Stuttgart)
 1994 Men's European Championships 5,000 metres (Helsinki)
 1996 Men's Olympic 5,000 metres (Atlanta)
 1997 Men's World Championships 5,000 metres (Athens)
 1998 Men's European Championships 5,000 metres (Budapest)

References
 Results
 Results - World Athletics

 
5000 metres at the World Athletics Championships